The Professional Building is a historic site in West Palm Beach, Florida. It is located at 310 South Dixie Highway. On October 24, 1996, it was added to the U.S. National Register of Historic Places.

References

External links

 Palm Beach County listings at National Register of Historic Places
 Professional Building at Florida's Office of Cultural and Historical Programs

National Register of Historic Places in Palm Beach County, Florida
Buildings and structures in West Palm Beach, Florida